The State of Israel was formally established by the Israeli Declaration of Independence on 14 May 1948, and was admitted to the United Nations (UN) as a full member state on 11 May 1949. , it has received diplomatic recognition from 165 (or ) of the  total UN member states, and also maintains bilateral ties with all of the Permanent Five. 28 member states have either never recognized Israel or have withdrawn their recognition; others have severed diplomatic relations without explicitly withdrawing their recognition. Additionally, many non-recognizing countries have challenged Israel's existence — predominantly those in the Muslim world — due to significant animosity stemming from the Israeli–Palestinian conflict and the Arab–Israeli conflict.

History
On 14 May 1948, the Israeli Declaration of Independence formally established a Jewish state in part of the former British Mandate of Palestine, in accordance with the United Nations Partition Plan. The Arab League was opposed to any partition and to the establishment of Israel, and an Arab coalition jointly invaded the territory of the newly formed country one day after its independence, sparking the 1948 Arab–Israeli War.

Following Israel's establishment, the Israeli provisional government was established to govern the Yishuv; and while military operations were still in progress, it was promptly granted de facto recognition by the United States, followed by Iran (which had voted against the Partition Plan), Guatemala, Iceland, Nicaragua, Romania, and Uruguay. The Soviet Union was the first country to grant de jure recognition to Israel on 17 May 1948, followed by Nicaragua, Czechoslovakia, Yugoslavia, and Poland. The United States extended de jure recognition after the first Israeli election, on 31 January 1949.

By the late 1960s, Israel had established diplomatic relations with almost all of the countries of Western Europe, North America, South America, and Sub-Saharan Africa combined.

To put additional diplomatic, economic, and military pressure on Israel in the wake of the 1967 Arab–Israeli War, oil-producing Arab countries imposed an oil embargo on countries that had bilateral relations with Israel. As a result, many African and Asian countries broke off their ties with Israel. The Soviet Union also shifted its support in favour of the Arab cause against Israel during this time, leading most countries of the Eastern Bloc to sever diplomatic ties in 1967; these included the Soviet Union itself, as well as Poland, Czechoslovakia, Hungary, and Bulgaria. Other countries in the Soviet sphere of influence, such as the People's Republic of China and Mongolia, also did not establish relations with Israel. Diplomatic relations with these countries were restored or established following the collapse of the Soviet Union, and new countries that had gained independence after the Soviet Union's dissolution also recognised Israel in their own right.

On 1 September 1967, the then-eight members of the Arab League issued the Khartoum Resolution, which included three pledges that forbade recognition, peace, and negotiations with Israel. However, Egypt, Jordan, and Mauritania gradually recognized Israel, though Mauritania broke off ties and withdraw recognition in 2010. As part of the 2020 Abraham Accords, the United Arab Emirates, Bahrain, Sudan, and Morocco all established normalized bilateral ties with Israel. Pressure was again exerted by the Arab League after the 1973 Arab–Israeli War, which led Cuba, Mali, and the Maldives to break off ties with Israel. Niger severed bilateral ties with Israel during the Second Intifada, and Venezuela broke off ties after the 2008–2009 Gaza War.

Following Israel's recognition of and entering into negotiations with the Palestine Liberation Organization (PLO), many African, Asian, and Arab countries either restored or established diplomatic relations with Israel. The Vatican began a bilateral relationship with Israel in 1994. Some countries broke or suspended relations during the 2006 Lebanon War and after the blockade of the Gaza Strip. Although Guinea broke diplomatic ties with Israel in 1967, Israel's extensive support for Guinea during its fight against an Ebola virus epidemic led to the re-establishment of bilateral relations in 2016. Nicaragua restored relations in March 2017; Chad did likewise in January 2019. The most recent country to establish diplomatic relations with Israel was Bhutan, on 12 December 2020.

United Nations membership
On 15 May 1948, one day after its independence, Israel applied for membership with the United Nations (UN), but the application was not acted on by the Security Council. Israel's second application was rejected by the Security Council on 17 December 1948 by a 5-to-1 vote, with 5 abstentions. Syria was the sole negative vote; the United States, Argentina, Colombia, the Soviet Union, and the Ukrainian SSR voted in favour; and Belgium, the United Kingdom, Canada, China, and France abstained.

Israel's application was renewed in 1949 after the first Israeli election. By Security Council Resolution 69 on 4 March 1949, the UN Security Council voted 9-to-1 in favour of Israeli membership, with Egypt voting against and the United Kingdom abstaining. Those voting in favour were China, France, the United States, the Soviet Union, Argentina, Canada, Cuba, Norway, and the Ukrainian SSR.

On 11 May 1949, the UN General Assembly, by the requisite two-thirds majority of its then-58 members, approved the application to admit Israel to the UN by General Assembly Resolution 273. The vote in the General Assembly was 37 to 12, with 9 abstentions. Those that voted in favour of Israel were: Argentina, Australia, Bolivia, the Byelorussian SSR, Canada, Chile, China, Colombia, Costa Rica, Cuba, Czechoslovakia, the Dominican Republic, Ecuador, France, Guatemala, Haiti, Honduras, Iceland, Liberia, Luxembourg, Mexico, the Netherlands, New Zealand, Nicaragua, Norway, Panama, Paraguay, Peru, the Philippines, Poland, the Ukrainian SSR, South Africa, the Soviet Union, the United States, Uruguay, Venezuela, and Yugoslavia. Those that voted against were six of the then-seven members of the Arab League (Egypt, Iraq, Lebanon, Saudi Arabia, Syria, and Yemen) as well as Afghanistan, Burma, Ethiopia, India, Iran, and Pakistan. Those abstaining were: Belgium, Brazil, Denmark, El Salvador, Greece, Siam, Sweden, Turkey, and the United Kingdom. Many of the countries that voted in favour or had abstained had already recognized Israel before the UN vote, at least on a de facto basis. Of these countries, Cuba and Venezuela have since withdrawn recognition.

Present situation 

, 165 of the  total member states of the United Nations (UN) recognize Israel. 28 UN member states do not recognize Israel: 15 members of the Arab League (Algeria, Comoros, Djibouti, Iraq, Kuwait, Lebanon, Libya, Mauritania, Oman, Qatar, Saudi Arabia, Somalia, Syria, Tunisia, and Yemen); ten non-Arab members of the Organization of Islamic Cooperation (Afghanistan, Bangladesh, Brunei, Indonesia, Iran, Malaysia, Maldives, Mali, Niger, and Pakistan); and Cuba, North Korea, and Venezuela. In 2002, the Arab League proposed the recognition of Israel by Arab countries as a pathway towards a resolution of the Israeli–Palestinian conflict under the Arab Peace Initiative. Following the Abraham Accords, which were signed in September 2020 between Israel and the United Arab Emirates and Bahrain, the Palestinian National Authority condemned any Arab agreement with Israel as dishonourable, describing them as a betrayal to the Palestinian cause and a blow to their quest for an independent Palestinian state.

The passports of some countries are not valid for travel to Israel, including Bangladesh, Brunei, Iran, Iraq, and Pakistan. Thirteen countries do not accept Israeli passports: Algeria, Bangladesh, Brunei, Iran, Iraq, Kuwait, Lebanon, Libya, Malaysia, Pakistan, Saudi Arabia, Syria, and Yemen. Some of these countries also do not accept passports of other countries whose holder has an Israeli visa or stamp on it. The stamp may be a visa stamp, or a stamp on entry or departure. Because of these issues, Israeli immigration controls do not stamp passports with an entry visa, instead stamping on a separate insert which is discarded on departure. However, a stamp of another country which indicates that the person has entered Israel may frustrate that effort. For example, if an Egyptian departure stamp is used in any passport at the Taba Border Crossing, that is an indication that the person entered Israel, and a similar situation arises for land crossings into Jordan. Some countries also ban direct flights and overflights to and from Israel. In August 2020, the United Arab Emirates permitted direct flights from Israel, and Saudi Arabia and Bahrain authorized overflights for such flights. On 8 October 2020, Israel and Jordan reached an agreement to allow flights to cross over both countries’ airspace.

The Israeli flag and national anthem were banned from the 2017 International Judo Federation (IJF) at Abu Dhabi, with Israeli contestants having to display the IJF's flag and anthem instead. The ban on Israeli symbols was lifted in 2018 and the Israeli flag and national anthem were allowed to be displayed. Miri Regev, the Israeli Minister of Culture and Sports, was also allowed to attend the October 2018 event in Abu Dhabi. In December 2017, seven Israelis were denied visas by Saudi Arabia to compete in an international chess tournament.

List by country
Legend:

UN member states

Non-UN member states

See also
Borders of Israel
Foreign relations of Israel
International recognition of the State of Palestine
Legitimacy of Israel
List of states with limited recognition
Right to exist
Self-determination

Notes

References

Foreign relations of Israel
Israel